Intercoastal may refer to

 Traffic between the East Coast of the United States and West Coast of the United States
 A misspelling of "intracoastal," as in Intracoastal Waterway